Cristian Colusso (born 7 February 1977) is an Argentine retired footballer who now works as a coach at Club Atlético San Telmo in Argentina.

Career
Born in Rosario, Santa Fe, Colusso began his professional football career with local side Rosario Central in the Argentine Primera División. At age 19, Colusso moved to Spain to join Sevilla F.C. However, after making only 6 La Liga appearances, he was forced out of the team through a scandal involving falsified signatures on his transfer documents.

In 2002 he spent 4 months on loan at Oldham Athletic notably scoring a last minute equaliser against Bury.

References

External links 
 Colusso: «Pasé cuatro años muy mal; sólo lo pude superar yendo a un psicólogo»
 Los peores fichajes de la Liga (III): Colusso 
 Colusso 
 De Caldas dice que le han estafado con el fichaje de Colusso
 Colusso looking for step up 
 Wadsworth keen to keep Colusso 
 Colusso preserves home rule 
 Argentina Doesn’t Benefit as Players Go Abroad 
 Ma la fantasia non è andata al potere Misso e Colusso, a confronto due «creativi» che non hanno brillato 
 Cristian Colusso 
 Es Una Baldosa Profile
 Soccerbase Profile
 BDFutbol Profile

Living people
1977 births
Argentine people of Italian descent
Argentine footballers
Association football midfielders
Argentine expatriate footballers
Oldham Athletic A.F.C. players
Expatriate footballers in Algeria
Expatriate footballers in England
Expatriate footballers in Ecuador
Expatriate footballers in Venezuela
Expatriate footballers in Mexico
Expatriate footballers in Italy
Expatriate footballers in Spain
Sevilla FC players
Rosario Central footballers
Club León footballers
Atlético Tucumán footballers
Carrarese Calcio players
Club Almirante Brown footballers
USM Blida players
Deportivo Anzoátegui players
San Martín de Mendoza footballers
C.D. Universidad Católica del Ecuador footballers
Footballers from Santa Fe, Argentina